Schluff is Krefeld's  historic steam locomotive and one of the oldest private railways in Germany.

References

External links
 Nordbahnhof

Krefeld
Rail transport preservation in Germany